Peter Allan Fields (May 12, 1935 – June 19, 2019) was a writer and producer, who was best known for many episodes of Star Trek: Deep Space Nine and Star Trek: The Next Generation.  He also wrote for The Six Million Dollar Man, including the episode "The Seven Million Dollar Man" (1974).

Fields died on June 19, 2019 at the age of 84.

Star Trek filmography 
 Star Trek: The Next Generation
 "Half a Life"
 "Cost of Living"
 "The Inner Light"
 Star Trek: Deep Space Nine
 "Dax"
 "Progress"
 "Duet"
 "The Circle"
 "Necessary Evil"
 "Blood Oath"
 "Crossover"
 "For the Uniform"
 "In the Pale Moonlight"
 "The Dogs of War'

Other selected contributions 
 Xena: Warrior Princess
 Knight Rider
 The Man from U.N.C.L.E.
 The Eddie Capra Mysteries

References

External links 
 

1935 births
2019 deaths
American male screenwriters
American television producers
American television writers
Place of death missing
Place of birth missing
American male television writers
Hugo Award-winning writers